Theodore Wirth Park is the regional park managed by the Minneapolis Park and Recreation Board. The park land is shared by Minneapolis and the neighboring suburb of Golden Valley. Formally named Theodore Wirth Regional Park, it includes two golf courses (an 18-hole course and a 9-hole par 3 course), Wirth Lake, Birch Pond, cross-country ski trails, mountain biking trails, snow tubing hills, and other amenities. It forms a significant portion of the Grand Rounds Scenic Byway, linking the Chain of Lakes area with the Victory Memorial Parkway.

History 
It was eventually named for Theodore Wirth, who was superintendent of Minneapolis parks for 30 years from 1906 to 1936.

Features 
A geographic marker at one corner of the park grounds, at Wirth Parkway and Golden Valley Road, marks the 45 degrees latitude line, exactly halfway between the equator and the North Pole. The badly weathered plaque was refurbished around 2006.

Gallery

External links
America's Byways: Theodore Wirth Park
Minneapolis Park & Recreation Board: Theodore Wirth Regional Park

References

Parks in Minneapolis
Regional parks in Minnesota
Protected areas of Hennepin County, Minnesota